"24's" is a song by American hip hop recording artist T.I., released April 29, 2003, as the lead single from his second studio album Trap Muzik (2003). It is his first song to enter the US Billboard Hot 100, peaking at number 78 on the chart in 2003. It was also featured on the street racing game Need for Speed: Underground.

Music video
The music video was edited for television standards. The video took place in Atlanta, Georgia, at a location which appears to be a parking lot or a condo with a large number of cars with 24-inch rims parked. At the beginning, comedian Lil Duval is presented in front of a car trying to talk to some girls. In another scene, T.I. is shown rapping and driving a Chevy with his now-deceased friend Philant Johnson, on the passenger side. At the end of the video, Duval and another comedian are shown in front of T.I.'s hotel room which is filled with women, who want to come in. Duval starts singing Jodeci's "Forever My Lady", then it shows T.I. hyping the crowd up. The video contains cameo appearances from DJ Toomp, Lil Duval, DJ Drama, and Jazze Pha.

Remix
The official remix was released later in the year and features DJ Paul & Juicy J of Three 6 Mafia, along with Big Kuntry King. This remix is also known as "Hypnotized 24's". During the summer, 50 Cent and Young Buck did one of their patented song jackings of T.I.'s "24's," on which they made up a new song using the same beat and the melody. The G-Unit duo named their track "44's and Calicos." T.I. himself later jacked "44's and Calicos" and adds new verses from P$C to go along with 50 and Buck. The song was titled "44's and Calicos II". "Jack my sh--, I don't care," T.I. says during the opening notes. "If you like it, I love it." Both remixes were included on the mixtape Gangsta Grillz Meets T.I. & P$C In da Streets (2003).

Censorship
The uncensored hook goes: "Money, hoes, cars and clothes, that's how all my niggas roll / Blowing dro on 24's, that's how all my niggas roll". The censored hook goes: "Money rolls, cars and clothes, that's how all my partners know / Burning roll of 24's, that's  how all my partners roll", and is much slower than the original uncensored version.

Charts

Weekly charts

Year-end charts

References

2002 singles
T.I. songs
Grand Hustle Records singles
Song recordings produced by DJ Toomp
Songs written by T.I.
Atlantic Records singles
Songs about cars